John S. Farrell (1880 – 1938) was an American politician who served as the 37th mayor of Green Bay, Wisconsin, from 1937 to 1939.

Biography
Farrell was born on May 4, 1880. He died on March 15, 1938, from apparent suicide by shotgun.

Career
Farrell served as an alderman and city councilman from 1905 to 1915. In 1923, he was appointed postmaster of Green Bay by U.S. President Warren G. Harding. He was later re-appointed by Presidents Calvin Coolidge and Herbert Hoover, serving until 1936. That year he ran as Republican for election to the United States House of Representatives from Wisconsin's 8th congressional district. He ultimately finished third in the election, with incumbent George J. Schneider winning the seat. The following year he was elected mayor of Green Bay, serving until his death.

References

See also
The Political Graveyard

Mayors of Green Bay, Wisconsin
Wisconsin city council members
Wisconsin Republicans
Wisconsin postmasters
1880 births
1938 suicides
Suicides by firearm in Wisconsin
American politicians who committed suicide
20th-century American politicians